Lahinch Golf Club is a links golf course in western Ireland, in the town of Lahinch on the northwest coast of County Clare in northern Munster. In 2016, Golf Digest ranked the Old Course at Lahinch #65 on their list of the world's greatest golf courses.

It was founded  in 1892 by Alexander W. Shaw and Richard J. Plummer, officials of Limerick Golf Club. They laid out an  course, the original course had ten holes on each side of the road.
It has been described as the "St. Andrew's" of Ireland.

The original links was laid out by Old Tom Morris; Alister MacKenzie, who co-designed Augusta National Golf Club, redesigned the Old Course and extended the links in 1927 for a fee of £2000. 
Lahinch is actually two 18-hole courses, the Old Course, is between the road and the sea, situated at the opposite side of the road from the Old Course is the Castle Course. The Castle Course is a flatter links named after the ruins of a nearby castle tower that stands to the north of the course. One unusual feature of the Old Course is the presence of goats which are allowed to roam freely across the course. They were originally owned by a caddie who lived near the course, and in 1956 a goat was incorporated into the club's logo.

Lahinch Golf Club is home to the South of Ireland Championship, an amateur golf tournament which began in 1895. Notable winners include Joe Carr in 1969, Darren Clarke in 1989, Paul McGinley in 1991 and Graeme McDowell in 2000. Ireland's Pádraig Harrington finished runner up on two occasions.

Lahinch Golf Club hosted the 2019 Dubai Duty Free Irish Open, which was played from 4–7 July. The tournament was hosted by Paul McGinley and won by Jon Rahm.

References

External links

Worldgolf Guide
Lahinch Course Guide
European Tour – 2019 Irish Open

Golf in Munster
Golf clubs and courses in the Republic of Ireland
Sports clubs in County Clare
Sports venues in County Clare
Irish Open (golf) venues